Lewis II is the second album by the British neo-soul composer and multi-instrumentalist Lewis Taylor, released in 2000.

Track listing
Party - 6:01
My Aching Heart - 5:25
You Make Me Wanna - 4:46
The Way You Done Me - 5:12
Satisfied - 5:53
Never Be My Woman - 4:31
I'm on the Floor - 5:03
Lewis II - 5:05
Into You - 3:53
Blue Eyes - 3:45
UK edition bonus track
Everybody Here Wants You (Jeff Buckley) - 4:51
Japanese edition bonus tracks
Everybody Here Wants You (Jeff Buckley) - 4:51
Electric Ladyland (Jimi Hendrix) - 4:20

All songs by Lewis Taylor, except when mentioned.

2000 albums
Lewis Taylor albums